Ene Mihkelson (21 October 1944 in Tammeküla, Imavere Parish, Viljandi County – 20 September 2017 in Tartu) was an Estonian writer. She was a recipient of the Herder Prize and the Baltic Assembly Prize for Literature.

Education
Mihkelson studied literature after completing her secondary education.  She worked as a teacher and then as a researcher for the Estonian Literary Museum.

Literature
Mihkelson wrote throughout her life.  She published her first literary piece in 1967.  However, her first collection of poems did not appear until 1978.  Her father opposed the Soviet forces in Estonia in the middle of the 20th century.  The authorities, therefore, did not approve of her.

Since the breakup of the Soviet Union, Mihkelson has published ten poetry anthologies.  Her poetry lacks meter, rhythm and rhyme, but contains surprising inversions.  It is known for its intensity, allegorical content and metaphysical topics.

Mihkelson has also published four novels, a selection of critical essays (Kirjanduse seletusi, or Explanations of Literature) and a collection of short stories (Surma sünnipäev, or The Birthday of Death). IN 2001 she published the novel Ahasveeruse uni.

Mihkelson's works frequently include allusions to her childhood, spent in hiding, Estonian mythology, and Estonian history.

In 2006, she was awarded the Herder Prize and in 2010, the Baltic Assembly Prize for Literature.

References

External links

1944 births
2017 deaths
People from Järva Parish
Estonian women poets
Estonian women novelists
Estonian women short story writers
20th-century Estonian poets
20th-century Estonian novelists
20th-century short story writers
21st-century Estonian poets
21st-century Estonian novelists
21st-century short story writers
Herder Prize recipients
21st-century Estonian women writers
20th-century Estonian women writers
Recipients of the Order of the White Star, 4th Class